Villa Lighthouse is a deactivated lighthouse in the municipality of Flatanger in Trøndelag county, Norway.  The lighthouse was built in 1839 and it was decommissioned in 1890.

Villa Lighthouse is located on the island of Villa in the Folda sea. It was constructed in a hexagonal shape. The lighthouse was built in 1839 and was the first lighthouse in Norway that was built north of the Trondheimsfjord. It was one of the six coal-fired lighthouses built in Norway during the 1800s, and it is generally considered to be the best preserved of them all.

In 1859, it was upgraded to burn liquid fuels.  When the lighthouse closed in 1890, the lens was moved to the Nordøyan Lighthouse. The lighthouse was replaced by the Ellingråsa Lighthouse on the nearby island of Bjørøya.

See also

Lighthouses in Norway
List of lighthouses in Norway

References

External links
 Norsk Fyrhistorisk Forening 
 Picture of Villa Lighthouse

Lighthouses completed in 1839
Lighthouses in Trøndelag
Flatanger